Éder Paul López Carreras (born 7 January 1993) is a Mexican footballer who plays as a midfielder for Tlaxcala F.C.

Club career
López made his professional debut with Pachuca on 25 July 2012, coming on for Diego Armendáriz during a Copa MX defeat to Universidad de Guadalajara.

References

External links

1993 births
Living people
Mexican expatriate footballers
Association football midfielders
C.F. Pachuca players
Pachuca Juniors footballers
Östersunds FK players
Tlaxcala F.C. players
Mineros de Zacatecas players
Ascenso MX players
Liga Premier de México players
Superettan players
Mexican expatriate sportspeople in Sweden
Expatriate footballers in Sweden
Footballers from Baja California Sur
Mexican footballers
People from Comondú Municipality